The Sleeping Beauty is a ballet in a prologue and three acts to music by Pyotr Ilyich Tchaikovsky, his Opus 66, completed in 1889. It is the second of his three ballets and, at 160 minutes, his second-longest work in any genre. The original scenario was by Ivan Vsevolozhsky after Perrault's La belle au bois dormant, or The Beauty Sleeping in the  Forest; the first choreographer was Marius Petipa. The premiere took place at the Mariinsky Theatre in St. Petersburg on January 15, 1890, and from that year forward The Sleeping Beauty has remained one of the most famous of all ballets.

History

Tchaikovsky was approached by the Director of the Imperial Theatres in St. Petersburg, Ivan Vsevolozhsky on 25 May 1888 about a possible ballet adaptation on the subject of the story of Undine. It was later decided that Charles Perrault's La Belle au bois dormant would be the story for which Tchaikovsky would compose the music for the ballet. Tchaikovsky did not hesitate to accept the commission, although he was aware that his only previous ballet, Swan Lake, met with little enthusiasm at that stage of his career.

Tchaikovsky based his work on Brothers Grimm's version of Perrault's 'Dornröschen'. In that version, the Princess's parents survive the 100-year sleep to celebrate the Princess's wedding with the Prince. However, Vsevolozhsky incorporated Perrault's other characters from his stories into the ballet, such as Puss in Boots, Little Red Riding Hood, Cinderella, Bluebird, Bluebeard, Ricky of the Tuft and Tom Thumb. Other French fairy tale characters to be featured are Beauty and the Beast, Pretty Goldilocks and The White Cat. Regardless, Tchaikovsky was happy to inform the Director of the Imperial Theatre that he had great pleasure studying the work and came away with adequate inspiration to do it justice.

The choreographer was Marius Petipa, ballet master of the Imperial Ballet, who wrote a very detailed list of instructions as to the musical requirements. Tchaikovsky worked quickly on the new work at Frolovskoye; he began initial sketches in the winter of 1888 and began orchestration on the work on 30 May 1889.

The ballet's focus was on the two main conflicting forces of good (the Lilac Fairy) and evil (Carabosse); each has a leitmotif representing them, which run through the entire ballet, serving as an important thread to the underlying plot. Act III of the work, however, takes a complete break from the two motifs and instead places focus on the individual characters of the various court dances.

The ballet's premiere received more favorable accolades than Swan Lake from the press but Tchaikovsky never had the luxury of being able to witness his work become an instant success in theatres outside of Russia. He died in 1893. By 1903, The Sleeping Beauty was the second most popular ballet in the repertory of the Imperial Ballet (the Petipa/Pugni The Pharaoh's Daughter was first), having been performed 200 times in only 10 years.

A production mounted at the La Scala in Milan did not arouse much interest and it was not until 1921 that, in London, the ballet finally gained wide acclaim and eventually a permanent place in the classical repertoire. In 1999, the Mariinsky Ballet reconstructed the original 1890 production, including reproductions of the original sets and costumes. Although the 1951 Kirov production by Konstantin Sergeyev is available on DVD/Video, the 1999 "authentic" version was never commercially released.

The Sleeping Beauty is Tchaikovsky's longest ballet, lasting nearly four hours at full length (counting the intermissions). The complete score runs practically 3 hours. It is nearly always cut.

At the premiere, Tsar Alexander III summoned Tchaikovsky to the imperial box. The Tsar made the simple remark 'Very nice,' which seemed to have irritated Tchaikovsky, who had likely expected a more favorable response. In any case the Tsar immediately paid Tchaikovsky a substantial bonus.

Performance history

St. Petersburg premiere (world premiere)

Date: 15 January 1890
Place: Imperial Mariinsky Theatre, St. Petersburg
Balletmaster: Marius Petipa
Conductor: Riccardo Drigo
Scene Designers: Henrich Levogt (Prologue), Ivan Andreyev (Act 1), Mikhail Bocharov (Acts 1 & 2), Matvey Shishkov (Act 3)
Director of the Imperial Theaters: Ivan Vsevolozhsky
Costumes:
Original Cast: Feliks Krzesiński (King Florestan), Giuseppina Cecchetti (Queen), Carlotta Brianza (Princess Aurora), Marie Petipa (Lilac Fairy), Enrico Cecchetti  (Carabosse, Bluebird), Pavel Gerdt (Prince Désiré), Varvara Nikitina (Princess Florine)

Moscow premiere

Date: 17 January 1899
Place: Moscow Imperial Bolshoi Theatre
Balletmaster: Aleksandr Gorsky
Conductor: Andrey Arends
Scene Designers: Anatoliy Geltser, Karl Valts (Waltz)
Original Cast: Lyubov Roslavleva (Princess Aurora), M. Grachevskaya (Lilac Fairy), Vasily Geltser (Carabosse), Ivan Khlyustin (Prince Désiré)

Other notable productions

1896, Milan, La Scala, staged by Giorgio Saracco, Carlotta Brianza as Aurora
1921, London, Alhambra Theatre, as The Sleeping Princess, Diaghilev production, staged by Nikolay Sergeyev, scenes by Léon Bakst
1937, Philadelphia, staged by Catherine Littlefield
1945, San Francisco, staged by Sergei Temoff for the San Francisco Russian Opera and Ballet Association
1946, London, Royal Opera House debut, performed by the Sadler's Wells Ballet.
1968, London, with the London Festival Ballet at the Royal Festival Hall
1978 at Stuttgart Ballet, choreographed by Marcia Haydée with sets by Jürgen Rose. The production shows Carabosse as a virtuoso role for a male dancer. It has been staged also at Turkish National Ballet (2000), Teatro Municipal Santiago de Chile (2006), Royal Ballet of Flanders in Antwerp (2006), West Australian Ballet in Perth (2010), Royal Swedish Ballet at Stockholm (2012), Korea National Ballet at Seoul (2016), Czech National Ballet at Prague (2021), Les Grands Ballets Canadiens (2022) and Berlin State Ballet (2022) 
1990, San Francisco, with San Francisco Ballet as choreographed by Helgi Tómasson in tribute to Tchaikovsky, and with a focus on maintaining the Russian-French connection
1992, Basel, Theater Basel reworked by Youri Vámos with new narrative involving the life of Anna Anderson and her claim to be Grand Duchess Anastasia. The order of musical numbers has been slightly changed, some numbers omitted with other music by Tchaikovsky added and major set pieces of Petipa's choreography retained, but now placed in different narrative context - often performed as Anderson's "memories". This version has been performed by a number of central European ballet companies over the past two decades. 
1999, St. Petersburg, Mariinsky Theatre, staged by Sergei Vikharev from Stepanov notations with recreations of the original sets and costumes.

Synopsis
Setting
Time: Baroque
Place: Europe

Prologue — Le baptême de la Princesse AuroreKing Florestan XXIV and his Queen have welcomed their first child, Princess Aurora, and declare a grand christening ceremony to honor her. Six fairies are invited to the ceremony to bestow gifts on the child. Each fairy brings a gift of a virtue or positive trait, such as beauty, courage, sweetness, musical talent, and mischief. The most powerful fairy, the Lilac Fairy, arrives with her entourage, but before she can bestow her gift, the evil fairy Carabosse arrives with her minions. Carabosse furiously asks the King and Queen why she had not received an invitation to the christening. The blame falls on Catalabutte, the Master of Ceremonies who was in charge of the guest list. Carabosse gleefully tears his wig off and beats him with her staff, before placing a curse upon the baby princess as revenge: Aurora will indeed grow up to be a beautiful, healthy, delightful young lady, but on her sixteenth birthday she will prick her finger on a spindle and die. The King and Queen are horrified and beg Carabosse for mercy, but she shows none. However, the Lilac Fairy intervenes. Though she does not have enough power to completely undo the curse, she alters it, allowing the spindle to cause a peaceful 100-year sleep for the princess, rather than death. At the end of those 100 years, she will be woken by the kiss of a handsome prince. Relieved that Aurora's life will ultimately be spared, the court is set at ease.

Act I — Les quatre fiancés de la Princesse AuroreIt is the day of Princess Aurora's sixteenth birthday. Celebrations are underway, though the King is still unsettled by Carabosse's omen. The master of ceremonies discovers several peasant ladies frolicking about with knitting needles and alerts the King, who initially sentences the women to a harsh punishment. The Queen gently persuades him to spare the innocent citizens, and he agrees. An elaborate waltz is performed and Princess Aurora arrives. She is introduced to four suitors by her doting parents. Aurora and the suitors perform the famous Rose Adagio. Presently, a cloaked stranger appears and offers a gift to the princess: a spindle. Having never seen one before, Aurora curiously examines the strange object as her parents desperately try to intervene. As predicted, she pricks her finger. While initially appearing to recover quickly, she falls into a swoon and collapses. The cloaked stranger reveals herself to be Carabosse, who believes that her curse still stands and that the princess is dead. Once again, the Lilac Fairy quells the hubbub and reminds the King and Queen that Aurora is merely asleep. The princess is carried off to bed, and the Lilac Fairy casts a spell of slumber over the entire kingdom, which will only be broken when Aurora awakens. A thick layer of thorny plants grows over the palace, hiding it from view.

Act II, Scene I — La chasse du Prince DésiréOne hundred years later, Prince Désiré is attending a hunting party. Though his companions are lighthearted, the prince is unhappy and eventually asks to be left alone. On his own in the forest, he is met by the Lilac Fairy, who has chosen him to awaken Aurora. She shows him a vision of the beautiful princess, and the prince is immediately smitten. The Lilac Fairy explains the situation, and Désiré begs to be taken to the princess. The Lilac Fairy takes him to the hidden castle. Carabosse makes one last attempt to cement her vengeful curse, but the Lilac Fairy and the prince manage to defeat her together at last. 

Act II, Scene II — Le château de la belle au bois dormantOnce inside the castle, Désiré awakens Aurora with a kiss. The rest of the court wakes as well, and the King and Queen heartily approve when the prince proposes marriage and the princess accepts.

Act III — Les noces de Désiré et d'AuroreThe royal wedding is under way. Guests include the Jewel Fairies: Diamond, Gold, Silver and Sapphire, and of course the Lilac Fairy. Fairytale characters are in attendance, including Puss in Boots and The White Cat, Princess Florine and the Bluebird, and others. Aurora and Désiré perform a grand Pas de Deux, and the entire ensemble dances. The prince and princess are married, with the Lilac Fairy blessing the union.

Roles

Instrumentation

Woodwinds:  2 Flutes, Piccolo, 2 Oboes, Cor anglais, 2 Clarinets (B, A), 2 Bassoons
Brass: 4 horns (F), 2 Cornets (B, A), 2 Trumpets (B, A), 3 Trombones, Tuba
Percussion: Bass Drum, Cymbals, Glockenspiel, Side Drum, Tambourine, Tam-tam, Timpani, Triangle
Keyboards: Piano
Strings: Harp, Violins I, Violins II, Violas, Cellos, Double basses

Musical structure 

Titles of the numbers here come from Marius Petipa's original scenario as well as the original libretto and programs of the 1890 production.  Major changes made to the score for Petipa's original production are mentioned, and help explain why the score is heard in various versions in theatres today. Libretti and programs of works performed at the Imperial Theatres were titled in French, being the court language as well as that of balletic terminology.

Prologue — Le baptême de la Princesse Aurore
No.1-a Introduction
No.1-b Marche de salon
No.2-a Entrée des fées
No.2-b Scène dansante
No.3 Grand pas d'ensemble (a.k.a. Pas de six) —
a. Grand adage. Petit allégro
b. Variation - Candide
c. Variation - Coulante–Fleur de farine
d. Variation - Miettes–qui tombent
e. Variation - Canari–qui chante
f. Variation - Violente–échevelée
g. Variation - La Fée des lilas–voluptueuse
h. Coda générale
No.4 Scène et final—
a. Entrée de Carabosse
b. Scène mimique de Carabosse
c. Scène mimique de la Fée des lilas

Act I — Les quatre fiancés de la Princesse Aurore
No.5-a Introduction
No.5-b Scène des tricoteuses
No.6 Grande valse villageoise (a.k.a. The Garland Waltz)
No.7 Entrée d'Aurore
No.8 Grand pas d'action—
a. Grand adage à la rose (harp cadenza extended by Albert Heinrich Zabel)
b. Danse des demoiselles d'honneur et des pages
c. Variation d'Aurore (coda edited by Riccardo Drigo)
d. Coda
No.9 Scène et final—
a. Danse d'Aurore avec le fuseau
b. Le charme
c. L'arrivée de la Fée des lilas

Act II, Scene I — La chasse du Prince Désiré
No.10-a Entr'acte
No.10-b Scène de la chasse royale
No.11 Colin-Maillard
No.12 Danses des demoiselles nobles—
a. Scène
b. Danse des duchesses
c. Danse des baronnes (cut by Petipa from the original production)
d. Danse des comtesses (cut by Petipa from the original production)
e. Danse des marquises (cut by Petipa from the original production)
No.13 Coda–Farandole
No.14-a Scène et départ des chasseurs
No.14-b Entrée de la Fée des lilas
No.15 Pas d'action—
a. L'apparition d'Aurore
b. Grand adage (harp cadenza extended by Albert Heinrich Zabe)
c. Valse des nymphes–Petit allégro coquet
Interpolation: 4 transitional bars for the end of no.15-c composed by Riccardo Drigo to lead into Brianza's variation
Interpolation: Variation Mlle. Brianza (originally No.23-b Variation de la fée-Or from Act III)
d. Variation d'Aurore (cut by Petipa from the original production)
e. Petite coda
No.16 Scène
No.17 Panorama
Interpolation: 3 transitional bars for the end of no.17 composed by Riccardo Drigo to lead into no.19, as no.18 was cut in the original production
No.18 Entr'acte symphonique (solo for violin for Leopold Auer, cut from the original production)

Act II, Scene II — Le château de la belle au bois dormant
No.19 Scène du château de sommeil
No.20 Scène et final – Le réveil d'Aurore

Act III — Les noces de Désiré et d'Aurore
No.21 Marche
No.22 Grand polonaise dansée (a.k.a. The Procession of the Fairy Tales)
Grand divertissement—
No.23 Pas de quatre
a. Entrée
b. Variation de la fée-Or (transferred by Petipa to Act II as a variation for Carlotta Brianza in the original production)
c. Variation de la fée-Argent (changed by Petipa in the original production – Pas de trois pour la Fées d'Or, d'Argent et de Saphir)
d. Variation de la fée-Saphir (cut by Petipa from the original production)
e. Variation de la fée-Diamant
f. Coda
Interpolation: Entrée de chats (a 10 bar introduction written by Tchaikovsky for no.24)
No.24 Pas de caractère – Le Chat botté et la Chatte blanche
No.25 Pas de quatre (changed by Petipa in the original production – Pas de deux de l'Oiseau bleu et la Princesse Florine)
a. Entrée
b. Variation de Cendrillon et Prince Fortuné (changed by Petipa in the original production – Variation de l'Oiseau bleu)
c. Variation de l'Oiseau bleu la Princesse Florine (changed by Petipa in the original production – Variation de la Princesse Florine)
d. Coda
No.26 Pas de caractère – Chaperon Rouge et le Loup
Interpolation: Pas de caractère – Cendrillon et Prince Fortuné
No.27 Pas berrichon – Le Petit Poucet, ses frères et l'Ogre
No.28 Grand pas de quatre (originally arranged by Petipa as a Pas de quatre for the Princess Aurora, Prince Désiré and the Gold and Sapphire Fairies)
a. Entrée (only the first eight bars were retained)
b. Grand adage
Interpolation: Danse pour les Fées d'Or et de Saphir in 6/8 (Petipa utilized the music for the Entrée to accompany a pas for the Gold and Sapphire Fairies)
c. Variation du Prince Désiré
d. Variation d'Aurore — Mlle. Brianza (edited by Riccardo Drigo for the original production)
e. Coda
No.29 Sarabande – quadrille pour Turcs, Éthiopiens, Africains et Américains (cut by Petipa from the original production)
No.30-a Coda générale
No.30-b Apothéose – Helios en costume de Louis XIV, éclairé par le soleil entouré des fées (music based on Marche Henri IV)

Trademark controversy
In 2007, The Walt Disney Company registered a trademark with the US Patent and Trademark Office for the name "Princess Aurora" that was to cover production and distribution of motion picture films; production of television programs; production of sound and video recordings. This could have limited the ability to perform this ballet, from which Disney acquired some of the music for its animated 1959 film Sleeping Beauty. However, this trademark has since been removed from the registry.

References

External links

Video samples
 The Sleeping Beauty - Choreography by Rudolf Nureyev
 The Ballet Soloist (aka Russian Ballerina) – 1947 Soviet musical film with scenes from Tchaikovsky's Swan Lake and The Sleeping Beauty. With subtitles in Esperanto.
 Solo of Prince Désiré from Pas de deux (Act 3) danced by Rudolf Nureyev (from YouTube)
Sleeping Beauty, Kirov Ballet, 1965 Corinth Films

Scores

History
 Tchaikovsky Research

Ballets by Marius Petipa
Suites by Pyotr Ilyich Tchaikovsky
1890 ballet premieres
1889 compositions
Works based on Sleeping Beauty
Ballets based on works by Charles Perrault
Ballets by Pyotr Ilyich Tchaikovsky
Ballets based on fairy tales
Ballets premiered at the Mariinsky Theatre